Max Marlow may refer to:
Max Marlow, pseudonym of British writing team Christopher Nicole and Diana Bachmann
Max Marlow (filmmaker) (born 1995), British filmmaker, writer and producer
Max Marlow (musician), British musician

See also
Max (given name)
Marlow (surname)